Savimäe may refer to several places in Estonia:

Savimäe, Põlva County, village in Põlva Parish, Põlva County
Savimäe, Võru County, village in Rõuge Parish, Võru County